The 2014–15 North Texas Mean Green men's basketball team represented the University of North Texas during the 2014–15 NCAA Division I men's basketball season. The Mean Green, led by third year head coach Tony Benford, played their home games at UNT Coliseum, nicknamed The Super Pit, and were members of Conference USA. They finished the season 14–17, 8–10 in C-USA play in a 4-way tie for seventh place. They lost in the first round of the C-USA tournament to Rice.

Previous season 
The Mean Green the season 16–16, 6–10 in C-USA play to finish 11th place. They advanced to the second round of the C-USA tournament where they lost to Tulane.

Departures

Incoming Transfers

Recruiting class of 2014

Recruiting class of 2015

Roster

Schedule

 
|-
!colspan=9 style="background:#059033; color:#000000;"| Exhibition

|-
!colspan=9 style="background:#059033; color:#000000;"| Regular season

|-
!colspan=9 style="background:#059033; color:#000000;"| Conference USA tournament

See also
2014–15 North Texas Mean Green women's basketball team

References

North Texas Mean Green men's basketball seasons
North Texas
North Texas Mean Green men's b
North Texas Mean Green men's b